Scott Logic is a UK-based software consultancy working in a variety of different sectors including capital markets; energy trading; e-trading; financial services; health care; oil & gas and the public sector. The company was founded in 2005 by Gary Scott, who worked as an executive director at Lehman Brothers before returning to the North East of England. In January 2021, Stephen Foreshew-Cain was appointed as the company's CEO, succeeding Gary Scott who remains as the company's chairman.

The consulting services that Scott Logic delivers include technology strategy and advice, user experience design, managed services and software development, testing and engineering, typically for large-scale enterprises with complex software systems and needs.

The company has five UK development centres in Newcastle, Edinburgh, Bristol, Leeds and London, and works with technologies including .NET, HTML5/jQuery and Java. As of the end of 2019, Scott Logic had around 330 employees, with a large number of consultants recruited for their technical expertise and academic achievements.

The consultancy business includes a graduate recruitment program, designed to attract developers from leading universities, and a paid summer internship.

Scott Logic owned shinobicontrols, a mobile technology brand providing software components, such as charting and other data visualisation tools, to native iOS and Android app developers. As of 5 November 2019, shinobicontrols was no longer operating.

Sponsorship
The company sponsors Agile North East and Bristech Meetup groups. It also partners with several universities, including Durham University, the University of Edinburgh and the University of Bristol. Annually, it sponsors computing awards at Heriot-Watt University and runs hackathons for computer science students at Newcastle University and Durham. Its developers are also active in their local communities, running after-school Code Clubs for nine- to eleven-year-olds, to teach them basic coding skills among other things.

In 2018, Scott Logic provided seed investment for the foundation of the Altitude Foundation, a charity which aims to support young people in the North East of England from under-privileged backgrounds to build careers in STEM industries. The investment was made possible thanks to a payout received by Scott Logic relating to work carried out for Lehman Brothers in the months before the bank’s collapse.

Awards
The company is a certified partner in the Microsoft Partner Network.

External links
 Scott Logic Ltd. website

Notes

Software companies of the United Kingdom
Companies based in Newcastle upon Tyne
Software companies established in 2005
2005 establishments in England
British companies established in 2005